The Luss Hills are a hill range located in Argyll, Scotland. They are part of the southern foothills of the Grampian Mountains and lie west of Loch Lomond, above the village of Luss in the Loch Lomond and The Trossachs National Park.

A popular destination for hillwalking, the highest peak in the range is Doune Hill at 734 m. Other Hills include Beinn Eich, Beinn Dubh and Mid Hill.

References

Mountain ranges of Scotland
Geography of Argyll and Bute